Fabio Sticotti (Friuli, Northern Italy 1676 – Paris, 5 December 1741) was an 18th-century Parisian comic actor. The husband of opera singer Ursula Astori, he arrived in Paris in 1716 and began acting only in 1733, in the role of Pantalone. He was a member of the Comédie-Italienne

The couple had three children: Antoine Jean (1715-1772), Michaelo and Agathe.

External links 
 Desboulmiers, Histoire anecdotique et raisonnée du Théâtre-Italien, vol. V, 1769,  : "Mort de Sticotti".

People from Friuli
1676 births
1741 deaths
18th-century Italian male actors
18th-century French male actors
French male stage actors